Ronald William John Keay (20 May 1920 – 7 April 1998) was a British botanist, who did much of his work in tropical Africa.

Keay was educated at the University of Oxford. He was an expert in West African forest flora working at the Royal Botanic Gardens, Kew, and at the Forest Herbarium Ibadan (FHI), part of the Forestry Research Institute of Nigeria (FRIN), and was director of that institute from 1960 to 1962. He collected specimens in Rhodesia, Nigeria, West Cameroon, the Congo, Rhodesia and Zambia.

During the 1970s and '80s he was a member, council member, treasurer and vice president of the Royal Society. After his retirement from the Royal Society he served as president of the Institute of Biology and also the treasurer of the Linnean Society of London.

Publications

Books

Conference proceedings

Species named in his honour
 Habenaria keayi Summerh., Bot. Mus. Leafl. 14: 217 (1951).
 Ledermanniella keayi (G.Taylor) C.Cusset, Adansonia sér. 2, 14(2): 274 (1974). (basionym: Inversodicraea keayi G.Taylor, Bull. Brit. Mus. (Nat. Hist.), Bot. 1: 78 (1953) Fig. 14

References

External links

 Keay, Ronald William John (1920-1998)
  Works by or about Keay, Ronald William John in libraries (WorldCat catalog)

1920 births
1998 deaths
British botanists
Alumni of the University of Oxford
British expatriates in Nigeria